Hellmuth Adolph August "Helmut" Röpnack (23 September 1884 in Läsikow, Ruppin – 19 August 1935) was a German amateur footballer who played as an inside forward and defender, competing in the 1912 Summer Olympics.

International career 
He was a member of the German Olympic squad and played one match in the main tournament as well as one match in the consolation tournament. Overall he won ten caps but couldn't secure a win with the DFB in these matches.

References

External links
 
 
 
 
 Profile at karlsruher-fv1891.de

1884 births
1935 deaths
German footballers
Germany international footballers
Olympic footballers of Germany
Footballers at the 1912 Summer Olympics
German footballers needing infoboxes
Association football inside forwards
Association football defenders